Plav is a town in north-eastern Montenegro. It has a population of 3,717 (2011 census). Plav is the centre of Plav Municipality (population of 9,081 following the formation of Gusinje Municipality).

Name
The name Plav (Плав) is derived from Slavic plav, "a flooded place" (poplava, "flood").

Geography

Plav is located at the foot of the Accursed Mountains range, adjacent to the springs of the river Lim.

The area contains many lakes and the most known is Lake Plav, one of the largest in this region. The lakes Hrid and Visitor are mountain lakes, and Visitor is noted for its floating island.

Plav is also renowned for its karst wells, among which are Ali Pasha of Gucia Springs and Oko Skakavica. Villages in the municipality include Gusinje.

History
The toponym Hotina Gora (mountains of Hoti) in the Plav and Gusinje regions on the Lim river basin in 1330 is the first mention of the Hoti name in historical records in the chrysobulls of Dečani. Šufflay considers this region as the original area of settlement of Hoti from which they moved southwards.

The Ottoman census organised in 1582-83 registered the Plav nahiyah within the Sanjak of Scutari with 18 villages; according to historian Milan Vasić all inhabitants had personal names with a Slavic character, and no Muslims were present.

According to a 16th-century travel record by Antonio Bruni, the inhabitants of the Plav region are partly Albanian and partly Serbian, with a large proportion belonging to historical Albanian tribes such as the Piperi, Kuči, Kelmendi, and Bjelopavlići.

After the Serbian-Venetian nobleman Mariano Bolizza in Cattaro (Kotor), who wrote the Relazione e descrizione del sangiacato di Scutari ("Relations and Description of the Sanjak of Scutari") in 1614 Plav was mostly inhabited by Albanians under the command of Sem Zaus (Cem Çaushi) of Podgorica.

The two strongest feudal families in the Plav-Gusinje region (~90 km to the northeast of Gruemirë) trace their origin to Gruemiri. The Rexhepagaj of Plav, Montenegro (now, Redžepagić-Rexhepagiqi) moved to Plav in the beginning of the 1650s where their ancestor took the Muslim name Veli when he converted. Rexhep Aga who gave the name to the family was a great-great-grandson of Veli. The Shabanagaj (now also known as Šabanagić) were related via marriage with the Bushati family of Shkodra. Shaban Aga, their eponymous ancestor was the son-in-law of Sulejman Pasha Bushati, sanjakbey of Shkodra. He was sent in Gusinje as the commander of the fortress around 1690. The Shabanagaj family owned large estates in Berane. Ali Pasha of Gusinje, commander of the League of Prizren was a Shabanagaj and Jashar Rexhepagiq, pedagogue in Kosovo, was a Rexhepagaj. 
Many other families in Plav also trace their origin to different historical tribes who migrated to the area. The Ferri (Ferović), Kërcaj (Krcić), Kuçi (Kuč), Medunaj (Medunanjin), Shabaj (Šabović), Toskaj (Toskić) descend from Kuči/Kuçi; the Canaj (Canović), Musajt (Musič), Rekaj (Reković), Mekuli (Mekulović) and Rugova (Rugovac) descend from Kelmendi; the Shahmanaj (Šahmanović) from Triesh;  the Begani (Beganović), Kasumi (Kasumović), Shalunaj (Šaljunović) from Shala; Basha (Bašič) and Hoxhaj (Hodžić) from Berisha; the Kastrat and Hot families from Kastrati and Hoti respectively.

In 1878, following the Treaty of Berlin, the city of Plav was ceded to Montenegro by the Ottoman Empire despite being considered by Albanian leaders as Albanian territory.Soon after however, armed resistance by the forces of the League of Prizren and their victory against Montenegrin troops at Battle of Novšiće (1879) prevented the implementation. Ottomans had to cede Ulcinj to Montenegro after pressure from the Great Powers in 1881. Plav onlybecame part of Montenegro after the First Balkan War in 1912.

The entry of the Montenegrin army in 1912-13 and the Yugoslav army after 1919 in Plav-Gusinje was accompanied by repressive policies against the local population.The Montenegrin army captured the region and entered Plav on 19 October and 20 October. Its entry was followed by a period of harsh military administration which until March 1913 had caused up to more than 1,800 killings of mostly local Muslim Albanians and 12,000 forced conversions to Christian Orthodoxy.

In 1919, an Albanian revolt, which later came to be known as the Plav rebellion rose up in the Plav, Gusinje and Rozaje districts, fighting against the inclusion of Sandzak in the Kingdom of Serbs, Croats and Slovenes. As a result, during the Serbian army's second occupation of Plav, which took place in 1919, Serb forces attacked Albanian populations in Plav and Gusinje, which had appealed to the British government for protection. About 450 local civilians were killed after the uprising was quelled. These events resulted in a large influx of Albanians migrating to Albania.

Dialect
Plav is almost entirely Muslim and either Slavic-speaking or Albanian-speaking. The Slavic dialect of Gusinje and Plav shows very high structural influence from Albanian. Its uniqueness in terms of language contact between Albanian and Slavic is explained by the fact that most Slavic-speakers in today's Gusinje are of Albanian origin, representing a case of an Albanian-speaking population shifting to a Slavic-speaking one.

Sport
In the area of the Plav municipality there are 13 sports clubs and societies that are actively engaged in sports and competitions. Some are in the First Montenegrin league and some in the Second Montenegrin league.

Sport clubs:

 Football Club Jezero
 Football Club Gusinje
 Football Club Polimlje
 Handball Club Plav
 Chess Club Jezero
 Karate Club Jezero
 Kayak Club Plavsko Jezero
 Sport Fishing Society Plavsko Jezero
 Mountaineering Skiing Society Kofiljaca
 Skiing-mountain Society Karanfil
 Mountaineering Society Visitor
 Hunting Society Rocks Plav
 Hunting Sports Society May carnation
 Basketball Club Balkanski Ris

Population
Plav is administrative centre of Plav Municipality, which in 2011 had a population of 9,081, mostly Bosniaks, with a smaller minority of Albanians and other groups. The town of Plav itself has 3,717 citizens.

As of 2011:
 Bosniaks – 2,806 (75,50%)
 Albanians – 341 (9,17%)
 Montenegrins – 182 (4,90%)
 Muslims – 175 (4,71%)
 Serbs – 165 (4,44%)
 Other – 48 (1,29%)

Historical population:
1981 - 3,348
1991 - 4,073
2003 - 3,165
2011 - 3,717

Notable people
Jakup Ferri, Albanian rebel
Esad Mekuli, Albanian poet and scholar. 
Miodrag Džudović, footballer
Mirsad Huseinovic, footballer
Mersim Beskovic, footballer
Ekrem Jevrić, singer
Jashar Rexhepagiq, pedagogue and member of the Academy of Sciences of Kosovo
Radovan Zogović, writer
Smail Tulja, convicted murderer of New Yorker Mary Beal and suspected of being the Butcher of Mons

International relations 

Plav is twinned with:

 Deçan, Kosovo

See also
Sandžak
Gusinje
FK Jezero
Bosniaks of Montenegro
Albanians in Montenegro

References

Sources

External links

 Plav
 Visit-Montenegro.com
 FK Jezero Plav
 Plav-Gusinje

 
Populated places in Plav Municipality
Sandžak
Accursed Mountains
Albanian ethnographic regions